KRT27 is a keratin gene.